Luna Shamsuddoha (4 October 1953 – 17 February 2021) was a Bangladeshi entrepreneur. She was the chairman of the software firm Dohatec New Media, in Dhaka Bangladesh, which she founded in 1992. She was the first woman to head any state-owned bank in Bangladesh. She was the chairman of state-owned Janata Bank Limited. She was also founder and president of Bangladesh Women in Technology (BWIT). She received the Bangladesh Business Award (2017) for her contribution to the country's economy and was honored with Anannya Top Ten Awards for her work in the local software industry as a woman entrepreneur. She was a board member of SME Foundation, Independent University Bangladesh (IUB), director of state-owned Agrani Bank Limited and Janata Bank Limited. She was featured on global forums on technology, e-Governance and women's economic participation and empowerment. Luna was a member of Council of Global Thought Leaders on Inclusive Growth, Switzerland. She joined as chairman of the state-owned Janata Bank Limited.

Early life and education
Shamsuddoha was born to Lutfar Rahman and Hasina Rahman on 4 October in Dhaka. She got her Secondary School Certificate (SSC) from Viqarunnisa Noon School and College and Higher Secondary School Certificate (HSC) from Holy Cross College. She had a master's degree in international relations from University of Dhaka.

Career
She began her career as a consultant in 1978 but she started the business in 1985 as the managing partner of The Executive Center. Prior to that, she functioned as an English Language teacher at British Council Language Resource Center and as a lecturer, English Language, Institute of Modern Languages, University of Dhaka.

She worked for Dohatec since 1992. Her company is an independent software vendor and system integrator. Dohatec provides software solutions to institutions, government agencies and corporations in North America, Europe, and Bangladesh. Dohatec's key clients are the World Bank, World Health Organization, US Postal Service, Government of Bangladesh and Bangladesh Army. The company is a Certifying Authority and issues Digital Certificates including identification certificates and SSL Certificates.

Shamsuddoha was a panelist in two sessions of the UN 59th Commission on the Status of Women and Moderator of UN Online Discussion, UN Women. She participated in UN ITC Trailblazers Summit: Transformations in Sourcing from Women, in São Paulo, Brazil 2015 – a call for the inclusion of women in public procurement.

Personal life
She was married to A. K. M. Shamsuddoha, a businessman. The couple had a daughter, Reem Shamsuddoha.

Awards
 Bangladesh Business Award, 2017
 Outstanding Woman in Business, 2017 
 Honorary Special Recognition Award by Global Women Inventors & Innovators Network (GWIIN), 2013 
 Anannya Top Ten Awards (2013)

Death 
She died while undergoing cancer treatment at a Singapore hospital on February 17, 2021, aged 67.

References

External links

1953 births
2021 deaths
Bangladeshi businesspeople
People from Dhaka
Holy Cross College, Dhaka alumni
Viqarunnisa Noon School and College alumni
University of Dhaka alumni